Soak City is a water park owned by Cedar Fair, located at the back of Kings Dominion in Doswell, Virginia.  It is included with the admission to the park.

History

When it debuted in 1992, it was originally named Hurricane Reef. In 1999, an expansion occurred to the water park and the attractions received new names and park was changed to WaterWorks. It has two sections, the Northside which was formerly known as Hurricane Reef, and Southside which is the newer section of WaterWorks. The water parks at Kings Island and Carowinds were also known as WaterWorks for a period of time before being renamed Boomerang Bay.

In 2015, Kings Dominion announced that WaterWorks would undergo a major expansion and be renamed Soak City, a name that has been used for other Cedar Fair water parks. The expansion included a new slide complex called Hurricane Heights featuring three unique slides, a new children's area called Splash Island, and the removal of the Shoot the Curl speed slides.
Tornado, a ProSlide Tornado slide, was removed at the start of the 2018 season. For the 2020 season, Soak City was scheduled to be expanded with the addition of Coconut Shores, a new sub-area located on the former site of Big Wave Bay. The area will feature Lighthouse Landing, a multi-story water play structure, and Sand Dune Lagoon, a children's wave pool. The opening of Coconut Shores was delayed until 2021 due to the COVID-19 pandemic.

Slides and attractions

See also
 List of Cedar Fair water parks

References

External links
 Official website

Cedar Fair water parks
Water parks in Virginia
Buildings and structures in Hanover County, Virginia
Tourist attractions in Hanover County, Virginia
1992 establishments in Virginia